Aditya Thakare (born 8 November 1998) is an Indian cricketer who represents Vidarbha. He made his first-class debut for Vidarbha in the 2017-18 Ranji Trophy on 29 December 2017. During the 2018 Under-19 Cricket World Cup he was added to the India's squad as cover for Ishan Porel, who suffered an injury. He made his List A debut for Vidarbha in the 2018–19 Vijay Hazare Trophy on 26 September 2018. In November 2019, he replaced unwell Kamlesh Nagarkoti in India's squad for the 2019 ACC Emerging Teams Asia Cup.

References

External links
 

1998 births
Living people
Indian cricketers
Vidarbha cricketers